Big Timber is a reality TV series about a timber business on Vancouver Island, Canada. The first season was mostly filmed from September 2019 to January 2020 and first broadcast by the Canadian History channel on 8 October 2020.
It has since been purchased and streamed worldwide via Netflix, who helped finance a second season due to its good reception on the streaming platform. The second season was filmed in 2021 and released again on History. The series was also released in its entirety on 18 July 2022 on Netflix. A third season was commissioned during the shooting of season 2, airing in September 2022.

Cast
 Kevin Wenstob – big boss
 Sarah Fleming – mill boss
 Erik Wenstob – head mechanic
 Coleman Willner – Head Sawyer
 "Firewood" John Brebber – logger
 Tyler Lindsay – junior mechanic
 Glen Fox – log buyer
 Shanise - problem solver
 Kevin G - yarder

Episodes

Reception

References

External links
 Big Timber – Season 1 at Netflix
 

Big Timber
2020 Canadian television series debuts
2020s Canadian documentary television series
English-language television shows
History (Canadian TV network) original programming
Television shows about agriculture
Television shows set in British Columbia